Oxyothespis is a genus of praying mantis in the family Toxoderidae. Members of this genus have been called grass mantises.

Species
The following species are recognised in the genus Oxyothespis:
Oxyothespis acuticeps
Oxyothespis alata
Oxyothespis apostata
Oxyothespis bifurcata
Oxyothespis brevicollis
Oxyothespis brevipennis
Oxyothespis dumonti (North African grass mantis)
Oxyothespis flavipennis
Oxyothespis longicollis
Oxyothespis longipennis
Oxyothespis mammillata
Oxyothespis maroccana
Oxyothespis meridionalis
Oxyothespis nilotica
Oxyothespis noctivaga
Oxyothespis parva
Oxyothespis pellucida
Oxyothespis persica
Oxyothespis philbyi
Oxyothespis senegalensis
Oxyothespis sudanensis
Oxyothespis tricolor
Oxyothespis villiersi
Oxyothespis wagneri

See also
List of mantis genera and species

References

 
Mantidae